Aristide Cavallari (8 February 1849 – 24 November 1914) was a Cardinal of the Roman Catholic Church who served as Patriarch of Venice.

Early life
Aristide Cavallari was born in Chioggia, Italy. He was educated at the Seminary of Chioggia, where he studied for the three years of theology.  His family moved to Venice, where he continued his studies at the Patriarchal Seminary of Venice.

Priesthood
He was ordained to the priesthood on 27 September 1872 by Cardinal Giuseppe Luigi Trevisanato, then Patriarch of Venice. After his ordination he did pastoral work in Venice, and also worked in the offices of the patriarchal curia.

Episcopate
Pope Pius X, Patriarch of Venice until his election as Pope, soon appointed Cavallari titular bishop of Philadelphia, and auxiliary bishop of Venice on 22 August 1903 and had him consecrated the next day in Rome by Cardinal Francesco Satolli. While the search for a new Patriarch was ongoing, Cavallari was named vicar general of Venice in January 1904. He exercised these offices until he himself was promoted to the patriarchal see of Venice on 15 April 1904 to fill the vacancy left by the election of Pius X.

Cardinalate
He was created Cardinal-Priest of Santa Maria in Cosmedin (deaconry elevated pro hac vice to title) in the consistory of 15 April 1907. He participated in the conclave of 1914 that elected Pope Benedict XV. He died shortly after this in November 1914. His remains were transferred to the Patriarchal Cathedral of Venice in November 1957.

References

1849 births
1914 deaths
20th-century Italian cardinals
People from Chioggia
Patriarchs of Venice
20th-century Italian Roman Catholic archbishops
Cardinals created by Pope Pius X